Westmount (2001 pop.: 3,000) is a suburban community in the Cape Breton Regional Municipality.

Geography
Located on the west bank of the Sydney River at the point where Sydney Harbour begins, Westmount faces Sydney's downtown.  Neighbouring communities include Point Edward, Coxheath and Edwardsville.

Education
Westmount has two elementary schools, as well as one post-secondary institution.  These include:

Robin Foote Elementary School (gr. P-6, latterly grades P-5)
Harbourview Montessori (elementary grades) 
This facility was opened in a building, formerly used by Robin Foote Elementary to accommodate Primary and Grade 1 overflow classes.
MacLennan Junior High School (gr. 7-9, latterly grades 6-8) 
MacLennan was decommissioned by the Cape Breton-Victoria Regional School Board in the mid-2010's and demolished several years later.
MacLennan was the first public school in Nova Scotia to obtain an internet connection, and produce an educational CD-ROM.
Canadian Coast Guard College

Government
As part of the CBRM, Westmount is represented by the municipal councilor for District 4, Steve Gillespie. Westmount is also represented by Jaime Battiste in the federal riding of Sydney-Victoria, and by Murray Ryan in the provincial riding of Northside-Westmount

Religion
With the exception of a few families almost the entire population of Westmount is Christian.  The churches located in Westmount include:
Holy Rosary Roman Catholic
Westmount United
Saint Aidan's Anglican 
Saint Aidan's was a member of St Mark's Parish in Coxheath, but was closed and de-consecrated in the mid-2000's. 
The building was used as a dance school for several years by the Cape Breton School of the Arts, but as of 2020 has been repurposed as apartments.

Amenities and places of interest
Westmount is home to Petersfield Provincial Park. The park was formerly a private family estate and home to the 18th century Mayor of New York City, David Mathews and later the industrialist and Senator, John Stewart McLennan.  The grounds have been designated as a historical property and are home to the ruins of a large manor house and caretaker's home.  Canada Day festivities are held at the park every year. The only building from the former estate that still stands is the boathouse, which was moved approx. 1 km down shore from the estate, and converted to a private residence.  

Other amenities in Westmount include:
Westmount Volunteer Fire Department
Royal Canadian Legion, Branch 126
The Dobson Yacht Club
Westmount Dental Office

Notable people
People of note who live or have lived in Westmount include:
Howie MacDonald, Cape Breton fiddler, Conservative candidate for the Sydney—Victoria district, during the 2004 and 2006 federal elections
Peter Mancini, politician, lawyer, MP for Sydney—Victoria (1997–2000)
David Mathews, British Loyalist who was active during the American Revolution, Mayor of New York City (1776–1783)
John Stewart McLennan, industrialist, publisher and politician.
John W. Morgan, politician, Mayor of the Cape Breton Regional Municipality (2000–2012)
John Newell, politician, MLA for Cape Breton The Lakes (1983–1988)

References

External links
 Cape Breton Regional Municipality Official Website
 The Canadian Coast Guard Official Website
 Robin Foote Elementary School
 HarbourView Montessori School
 The Dobson Yacht Club
 Historic Nova Scotia - Petersfield

Communities in the Cape Breton Regional Municipality